Ngangie is one of 11 islands in the Rakahanga atoll of the Cook Islands. It is a motu on the east of the atoll, between the islets of Huananui and Akaro.

References

Rakahanga